Paulo de Tarso Alvim (1919 - 18 February 2011) was a Brazilian recipient of the Order of Scientific Merit in Biology.

References

Recipients of the Great Cross of the National Order of Scientific Merit (Brazil)
1919 births
2011 deaths
Brazilian biologists